Darkworld Detective is a collection of science fantasy stories written by J. Michael Reaves, published as a paperback original by Bantam Books in 1982. The linked stories feature protagonist, a detective on the planet Ja-Lur. An authorized sequel, The Black Hole of Carcosa, was written by John Shirley and published by Pocket Books in 1988.

Contents 
"The Big Spell" (reprinted from Weird Heroes #8)
"The Maltese Vulcan" (reprinted from Weird Heroes #8)
"Murder on the Galactic Express"
"The Man with the Golden Raygun"

Reception 
Writing in F&SF, John Clute described the volume as "dim but decent," faulting Reaves's narrative style as "about as close to Raymond Chandler as Kai Lung is to Confucius" but concluding that the stories are nevertheless "mostly straightforward fun."

References

External links 

1982 books
1982 short stories
Novels by Michael Reaves